Moran is a modern Irish surname derived from membership of a medieval dynastic sept. The name means a descendant of Mórán. “Mor” in Gaelic translates as big or great and “an” as the prefix the. Morans were a respected sept of the Uí Fiachrach dynasty in the western counties of Mayo and Sligo.  In Ireland, where the name descended from the Gaelic, it is generally pronounced   anglicised approximate of the Irish pronunciation.

There are many different crests of Moran, many bearing three stars and the motto Lucent in tenebris, Latin for "They shine in darkness". Another crest, attributed to the family of a Moran family living in Ballina, County Mayo, is described thus: "Azure on a mount proper, two lions combatant or, holding between them a flagstaff also proper, therefrom a flag argent; a crest: out of amural crown, a demi-saracen, head in profile, all proper; and a motto: 'Fides non timet.' (This motto translates as "Faith does not fear" or "The Faithful Fear Not".)

The majority of bearers of this surname in County Mayo are descended from the Ó Móráin sept whose ancient kingdom was in north Mayo, surrounding the modern town of Ballina.  Following the Norman invasion, their territory was usurped by the Barretts and Burkes and the sept lost its central organisation. The modern distribution of the surname within Mayo suggests that the Morans spread southwards and today are chiefly found in the central area of the county, particularly in the barony of Carra.

The majority of bearers of this surname in County Leitrim descended from the Ó Móráin sept of the Muintir Eolais, and more specifically the Conmhaicne of Maigh Nissi, who lived along the River Shannon.

People named Moran

A–F
 Alice Moran, Canadian actress
 Bernard N. Moran, American politician
 Bill Moran (disambiguation)
 Brian Moran (disambiguation)
 Bugs Moran (1891–1957), Chicago Prohibition-era gangster
 Caitlin Moran (born 1975), British writer and journalist
 Charles Moran (baseball) (1879–1934), American baseball player
 Charley Moran (1878–1949), American baseball player and football coach
 Chris Moran (1956–2010), Royal Air Force officer
 Clarence Gabriel Moran (d. 1953), barrister and writer
 Colin Moran (born 1992), American baseball player
 Crissy Moran (born 1975), American former pornographic actress and model
 Daniel Keys Moran (born 1962), American computer programmer and science fiction writer
 David Moran (disambiguation)
 Denis Moran (Gaelic footballer) (born 1956), Irish Gaelic football player
 Dennis Moran (computer criminal) (1982–2013), American computer hacker
 Dennis Moran (rugby league) (born 1977), British rugby league 
 Diana Moran (born 1939), British model, fitness expert and journalist
 Dolores Moran (1926–1982), American film actress and model
 Dov Moran (born c.1956), Israeli engineer, inventor and businessman
 Dylan Moran (born 1971), Irish comedian, writer, actor and film-maker
 Earl Moran (1893–1984), American pin-up and glamour artist
 Edward Moran (disambiguation)
 Ellen Moran (born 1967), American politician
 Emilio Moran, American anthropologist
 Erin Moran (1960–2017), American actress
 Fernando Morán (politician) (1926–2020), Spanish diplomat and politician 
 Frances Moran (1893–1977) Irish barrister and legal scholar
 Frank Moran (1887–1967), American boxer and film actor

G–N
 Gayle Moran (fl. 1970s), British musician
 Graeme Moran (1938–1996), New Zealand Rower
 Gussie Moran (1923–2013), American tennis player 
 Hap Moran (1901–1994), American professional football player
 Herbert Moran (1885–1945), Australian rugby union player
 Ian Moran (born 1972), American professional ice hockey player
 Ian Moran (born 1979), Australian cricketer
 Jack Moran (disambiguation)
 Jackie Moran (1923–1990), American movie actor
 James Moran (disambiguation)
 Jason Moran (1967–2003), Australian criminal
 Jason Moran (musician) (born 1975), American jazz pianist
 Jerry Moran (born 1954), United States Senator from Kansas
 Jim Moran (disambiguation)
 Joe Moran, British social and cultural historian
 John Moran (disambiguation)
 Jovani Morán (born 1997), Puerto Rican baseball player
 Judy Moran (born 1944), matriarch of Australian criminal family
 Julie Moran (born 1962), American television personality
 Kenneth Moran (c. 1919–1946), New Zealand boxer
 Kevin Moran (disambiguation)
 Layla Moran (born 1982), British politician
 Lewis Moran (1941–2004), Australian criminal
 Lindsay Moran (born 1969), American former Central Intelligence Agency officer, now a writer
 Lois Moran (1909–1990), American actress
 Malcolm Moran, American sports writer
 Margaret Moran (born 1955), British politician
 Margarita Moran-Floirendo (born 1953), Filipino former Miss Universe, peace advocate 
 Mark Moran (disambiguation)
 Martin Moran (born 1959), American actor
 Martin Moran (climber) (1955-2019) British mountaineer
 Martin Moran (footballer) (fl. 1900s), Scottish footballer
 Matt Moran, Australian chef
 Mayo Moran (born 1959), dean of the Faculty of Law of the University of Toronto
 Michael Moran (disambiguation)
 Michelle Moran (born 1980), American novelist
 Mike Moran (music producer) (born 1948), English keyboard musician and producer
 Nancy Moran, American singer and songwriter
 Nick Moran (born 1968), British actor

O–Z
 Paddy Moran (disambiguation)
 Pat Moran (disambiguation)
 Patrick Moran (disambiguation)
 Paul Moran (disambiguation)
 Pauline Moran (born 1947), English actress
 Peggy Moran (1918–2002), American film actress
 Percy Moran (1862–1935), American artist
 Peter K. Moran (1767–1831), Irish composer and pianist
 Polly Moran (1883–1952), American actress and comedian
 Rachel Moran (born 1956), American lawyer
 Regina Moran, Irish Engineer
 Reid Venable Moran (1916–2010), American botanist and museum curator
 Richard Moran (disambiguation)
 Robert Moran (born 1937), American composer
 Robert Moran (shipbuilder) (1857–1943), American shipbuilder
 Rocky Moran (born 1950), American race car driver
 Roger Moran, British hillclimb driver
 Ronnie Moran (1934–2017), British football coach
 Sam Moran (born 1978), Australian entertainer
 Sean Moran (born 1973), American football player
 Shane Moran (born 1960), Australian businessman
 Shawn Moran (born 1961), American speedway rider
 Simon Moran, British concert promoter
 Shlomo Moran (born 1947), Israeli computer scientist
 Steve Moran (born 1961), English football player
 Terry Moran (born 1959), American journalist
 Terry Moran (public servant) (born 1947), senior official in the Australian Public Service
 Thomas Moran (disambiguation)
 Tom Moran (disambiguation)
 Tony Moran, American remixer, producer and singer-songwriter
 Tony Moran (actor) (born 1957), American actor and producer
Trevi Moran, American recording artist, singer and YouTube personality
 Vic Moran, Scottish curler
 William Joseph Moran (1906–1996), American Roman Catholic bishop
 William L. Moran (1921–2000), American Assyriologist

Fictional characters
 Alex Moran, principal character in the Spike TV series Blue Mountain State
 Blake Moran, main character of the TV series Madam Secretary
 Gia Moran, the Yellow Ranger in Power Rangers Megaforce and Power Rangers Super Megaforce
Jacques Moran, second narrator and seeker of the eponymous Molloy in the novel by Samuel Beckett
 Jacques Moran, son of Jacques Moran, second narrator of Molloy; as Moran père writes, "His name is Jacques, like mine. This cannot lead to confusion."
 Lucy Moran, character in Twin Peaks
 Michael Moran, the central character in John McGahern's novel Amongst Women
 Moran, a female Irish Quidditch player in Harry Potter and the Goblet of Fire
 Pamela Moran, a main character from the TV series Army Wives
 Sebastian Moran, Moriarty's henchman in the Sherlock Holmes short story "The Adventure of the Empty House"
 Summer Moran, a recurring character in Clive Cussler's novels featuring Dirk Pitt
Simon Moran, a main character in "The Returned" series.

See also
 Moeran
 Moran family
 Morán
 Morant, surname
 Morin (disambiguation)
 Muintir Eolais
Morand (surname)
Morland (surname)
Moland (surname)

References

Irish families
Surnames of Irish origin
People of Conmaicne Maigh Nissi
English-language surnames
Surnames of British Isles origin